The 2012 Ball State Cardinals football team represented Ball State University in the 2012 NCAA Division I FBS football season. They were led by second-year head coach Pete Lembo and played their home games at Scheumann Stadium. They were a member of the West Division of the Mid-American Conference. They finished the season 9–4, 6–2 in MAC play to finish in a tie for second place in the West Division. They were invited to the Beef 'O' Brady's Bowl where they were defeated by UCF. The Cardinals were led by Junior QB #10 Keith Wenning with 3,095 yards passing, 24 touchdown passes and 10 interceptions.

Schedule

Game summaries

Eastern Michigan

@ Clemson

@ Indiana

South Florida

@ Kent State

Northern Illinois

Western Michigan

@ Central Michigan

@ Army

@ Toledo

Ohio

@ Miami (OH)

UCF–Beef 'O' Brady's Bowl

References

Ball State
Ball State Cardinals football seasons
Ball State Cardinals football